Sergiusz Wołczaniecki (born November 9, 1964 in Zaporizhzhia) is a Polish weightlifter. He won the Bronze medal in 90 Kg in the 1992 Summer Olympics in Barcelona. .

References

1964 births
Living people
Olympic medalists in weightlifting
Olympic silver medalists for Poland
Olympic weightlifters of Poland
Weightlifters at the 1992 Summer Olympics
Medalists at the 1992 Summer Olympics
Sportspeople from Zaporizhzhia
Polish male weightlifters
21st-century Polish people
20th-century Polish people